Myrophis lepturus is an eel in the family Ophichthidae (worm/snake eels). It was described by Adolf Kotthaus in 1968. It is a marine, tropical eel which is known from the Gulf of Aden in the western Indian Ocean.

References

Taxa named by Adolf Kotthaus
Fish described in 1968
Myrophis